Fania's Heart is a 2018 children's picture book by Anne Renaud. Based on a true story, it is about a girl, Sorale, who finds a small handmade book amongst her mother's possessions, and is then told the story behind it. The original book is held at the Montreal Holocaust Museum.

Reception
Dina Weinstein, who reviewed Fania's Heart for Jewish Book Council, wrote "The inspiring story, which takes place in one of the most demeaning of settings, shows that even the powerless can provide hope and warmth to one other."

Fania's Heart has also been reviewed by Kirkus Reviews, Quill & Quire, CM: Canadian Review of Materials, School Library Journal, and Resource Links.

It won the 2018 Canadian Jewish Literary Award for Children and Youth Fiction.

References

2018 children's books
Canadian children's books
Canadian picture books
Books about the Holocaust